Raphael José Botti (born 23 February 1981), commonly known as Botti, is a former Brazilian professional footballer.
 
Botti started his professional football career with Vasco da Gama and then joined Jeonbuk Hyundai Motors (2002~06). Botti had saved his best performances for the 2006 AFC Champions League and scored an important goal at the 1st leg of final. However, Botti then transferred to Vissel Kobe after the 2006 FIFA Club World Cup.

Club statistics

Honours
AFC Champions League 2006 Champions

External links

 

1981 births
Living people
Association football midfielders
Brazilian footballers
Brazilian expatriate footballers
CR Vasco da Gama players
Jeonbuk Hyundai Motors players
Vissel Kobe players
Figueirense FC players
Campeonato Brasileiro Série A players
Campeonato Brasileiro Série B players
K League 1 players
J1 League players
Expatriate footballers in South Korea
Expatriate footballers in Japan
People from Juiz de Fora
Brazilian expatriate sportspeople in South Korea
Brazilian expatriate sportspeople in Japan
Brazilian people of Italian descent
Expatriate footballers in Thailand
Sportspeople from Minas Gerais